Megachile japonica is a species of bee in the family Megachilidae. It was described by Alfken in 1903.

References

Japonica
Insects described in 1903